Pandit Niranjan Prasad (11 November 1941 - 31 March 2013) was an Indian flutist. He belonged to Allahabad.

Career
Prasad belonged to Varanasi Gharana and was one of the principle disciples of Flute and Shehnai player, Shri Bholanath Prasanna. He was a Guru-Bhai of international flutist Hariprasad Chaurasia. He performed at major music festivals and conferences throughout India, America, Australia, Europe and countries like Iran, Iraq, Kuwait, Baghdad and Bahrain of the Middle East. He used to feature regularly on Indian national radio and television.

His flute recital highlights serene development of Raag along with exquisite swift phraseology. He had command over the blowing of the instrument which facilitated the projection of emotional appeal.

He also played flute in films from 1964 to 1972. From 1974 he was also associated with National Orchestra A.I.R. New Delhi and retired from A.I.R. Lucknow in 2001.

Prasad worked with Pandit Vinay Bharat Ram society, U.P. Sangeet Natak Akademy, Birju Bawra Sangeet Samiti, U.P. Saanskritik Nideshalaya, Sur Sarang Society of Delhi, PM House in the time of Late Ex PM Shri Rajiv Gandhi and National Orchestra of India in Delhi. He was the founder of Dr. Ambedkar Sangeet Akademy  (Lucknow) and Ex-Professor N. R. Sangeet Vidhalaya (Allahabad). The music museum of Baghdad still houses a flute gifted by him to the institute.

His work featured in the Bollywood Movies Guddi, Shor, Dharkan and Prem Parvat.

He was an empaneled artist of ICCR.

On his first death anniversary in 2014, "Niranjan Smriti", a tribute to him was organized in Sangeet Natak Academy, Lucknow. His book on music, "Sadhna ke Phool" was released. His co-artist Padma Vibhushan Yamini Krishnamurthy graced the occasion with a dance performance by herself and her group, other performances included flute recitals of Sh Saurabh Banaudha and Sh Rajshekhar Dalbehera.

References

External links
Empaneled Artist at ICCR 
Pandit Niranjan Prasad, Flute Maestro passes away
Performance, 1972

Indian flautists
1941 births
2013 deaths
Musicians from Allahabad